Metasia liophaea is a species of moth of the family Crambidae. It is found in Australia, where it has been recorded from New South Wales and the Australian Capital Territory.

Adults have fawn forewings with a faint pattern of zigzag lines and spots.

References

Moths described in 1887
Moths of Australia
Metasia